The Engin Blindé du Génie ("armoured engineering vehicle") is a military engineering vehicle built upon the chassis of the AMX-30 battle tank.

External links 

 chars-francais.net

Armoured fighting vehicles of France
Military engineering vehicles